Weymouth High School (WHS) is a comprehensive public high school in Weymouth, Massachusetts, United States that serves  students in grades nine through twelve. Weymouth High School also offers a Career and Technical Education Program offering such courses as Aesthetics, Allied Health, Architectural Design, Automotive Technology, Early Childhood Education, Information Technology, Construction Technology, Cosmetology, Culinary Arts, Graphic Communications and Metal Fabrication.

History
Weymouth High School was first established in 1854.  The building that used to house Weymouth High in the early 20th century stood next to the Town Hall on Middle Street.   The building that currently houses Weymouth High School opened in 2004 at One Wildcat Way in South Weymouth. This building was the original Weymouth South High School and most recently housed the junior high school students in Weymouth. The old Weymouth South High School is known as the "Maroon Building." The "Gold Building" was newly constructed for the opening in 2004, and was built on the site of the old South Intermediate School. This expansion cost the school approximately $22 million.  In June 2021, Weymouth High School was placed into a state program for schools or districts that disproportionately suspend nonwhite students or students with disabilities.

Athletics and activities
Weymouth High School students partake in a range of after-school clubs and activities. These activities include chapters of SADD and Amnesty International, a Student Senate, a Math Team, a Concert Band, a Choir, a Theater Company, an FRC Robotics Team, and a Yearbook Committee.

Graduation
The minimum number of courses that one must take from 9th–12th grade are as follows:
3 credits of History courses (US History II required)
4 credits of English courses (English 9, 10, 11 & senior electives required)
3 credits of Mathematics courses (Class of 2016 and beyond 4 math credits)(Mathematics course in grade 10 required)
3 credits of Science courses (Class of 2015-2017 minimum of 2 lab science, Class of 2018 and beyond minimum of 3 lab sciences)(Biology course required to be taken in grade 9 or 10)
1.5 credits of Unified Arts (Not required for CTE Students)
1.0 credits of Physical Education (CTE students are required to take .4 credits)
0.25 credits of Health Education

Sources

1854 establishments in Massachusetts
Bay State Conference
Public high schools in Massachusetts
Schools in Norfolk County, Massachusetts
Weymouth, Massachusetts